Leticia Noemí De León (stage name, Cachita Galán; 1943 in Buenos Aires – 2 December 2004, in Parque Patricios) was an Argentine singer. She is remembered for her vocal interpretations at the Club del Clan, and for her performance in the 1964 film El Club del clan.

Early years and education 
Galan studied classical dance from an early age and made a career as a dancer during her childhood. She also loved sports, especially swimming. By age eight, she was singing Spanish songs. She performed in theaters dedicated to that genre, such as Avenida and Tronío, with Pedrito Rico, Pablo del Río and Lolita Torres.

Career
With "Los Gavilanes of Spain", she debuted in Ecuador, along with the tenor, Galo Cárdenas, whom she also married when she was 19 years old. Together, they were performed at La Cantina de la Guardia Nueva. Her fame accelerated after performing on the TV program El Club del Clan, which was popular in the 1960s, along with her contemporaries Violeta Rivas, Raúl Lavié, Johny Tedesco, Nicky Jones, Chico Novarro, Palito Ortega and Lalo Fransen. Along with Rivas and Jolly Land, she formed a female vocal trio. The producer, Ricardo Mejía, gave her the nickname, Cachita, and encouraged her to sign, strut, and dance.

Traveling to Ecuador, they met with success at El Club del Clan, touring the country, as well as Venezuela, Colombia, Perú, México, appearing at the Hilton chain, and other night spot. When her daughter was born, she stopped performing for a few years. Then she returned to Los Gavilanes de España and also joined the orchestra of Casino Show, which toured in Spain, performing Spanish and Brazilian pieces. In 1964, she appeared in the Argentine film, Club del Clan, under the direction of Enrique Carreras, with Beatriz Bonet, Fernando Siro, Pedro Quartucci, Alfredo Barbieri and Tito Climent, where she sang the song, Soplame un beso. She is also remember for performing with the Roberto Casal Orchestra, including the pieces, El labrador, Juancho, Cumbia litoraleña and Interesada.

Personal life
After her daughter Nadia was born, she separated from her husband, and never remarried. Galan died on 2 December 2004 at the age of 61, a victim of a cancer which she had fought for four years. Her remains were cremated in the Cementerio de la Chacarita.

Interpretations 
 Noche y día, with Lalo Fransen
 Cara sucia
 Señor elefante, with Perico Gómez
 Don Juan Ramón
 Sóplame un beso
 Las Cerezas
 Alumbra, alumbra luna
 Besucona

Filmography 
 1964: Club del Clan

Television 
 1961: Ritmo y juventud
 1962:  Cantarela
 1963: El club del clan

References

External links

Argentine film actresses
Argentine female dancers
20th-century Argentine women singers
2004 deaths
Deaths from cancer in Argentina
1943 births
Burials at La Chacarita Cemetery